The following is a list of massacres that have occurred in São Tomé and Príncipe (numbers may be approximate):

Sao Tome and Principe
Massacres

Massacres